Khachig River (Tick river) is a river in the north west region of Mongolia. It is a tributary of the Tes River.

Rivers of Mongolia